Mustelus,  also known as the smooth-hounds, is a genus of sharks in the family Triakidae. The name of the genus comes from the Latin word mustela, meaning weasel.  It should not be confused with the genus name Mustela, which is used for weasels.

A smooth-hound can grow to 159 cm (5 ft. 3 in.) long and weigh more than 13 kg (29 lb).

Species
Currently, 28 recognized species are placed in this genus:
 Mustelus albipinnis Castro-Aguirre, Antuna-Mendiola, González-Acosta & De La Cruz-Agüero, 2005 (white-margin fin houndshark)
 Mustelus andamanensis White, Arunrugstichai & Naylorn, 2021 (Andaman smooth-hound)
 Mustelus antarcticus Günther, 1870 (gummy shark)
 Mustelus asterias Cloquet, 1821 (starry smooth-hound)
 Mustelus californicus T. N. Gill, 1864 (gray smooth-hound)
 Mustelus canis Mitchill, 1815 
 M. c. canis Mitchill, 1815 (dusky smooth-hound)
 M. c. insularis Heemstra, 1997 (Caribbean smooth-hound)
 Mustelus dorsalis T. N. Gill, 1864 (sharptooth smooth-hound)
 Mustelus fasciatus Garman, 1913 (striped smooth-hound)
 Mustelus griseus Pietschmann, 1908 (spotless smooth-hound)
 Mustelus henlei T. N. Gill, 1863 (brown smooth-hound)
 Mustelus higmani S. Springer & R. H. Lowe, 1963 (smalleye smooth-hound)
 Mustelus lenticulatus Phillipps, 1932 (spotted estuary smooth-hound)
 Mustelus lunulatus D. S. Jordan & C. H. Gilbert, 1882 (sicklefin smooth-hound)
 Mustelus manazo Bleeker, 1854 (starspotted smooth-hound)
 Mustelus mangalorensis Cubelio, Remya R & Kurup, 2011 (Mangalore houndshark) 
 Mustelus mento Cope, 1877 (speckled smooth-hound)
 Mustelus minicanis Heemstra, 1997 (dwarf smooth-hound)
 Mustelus mosis Hemprich & Ehrenberg, 1899 (Arabian smooth-hound)
 Mustelus mustelus Linnaeus, 1758 (common smooth-hound)
 Mustelus norrisi S. Springer, 1939 (narrowfin smooth-hound)
 Mustelus palumbes J. L. B. Smith, 1957 (whitespotted smooth-hound)
 Mustelus punctulatus A. Risso, 1827 (blackspotted smooth-hound)
 Mustelus ravidus W. T. White & Last, 2006 (Australian grey smooth-hound)
 Mustelus schmitti S. Springer, 1939 (narrownose smooth-hound)
 Mustelus sinusmexicanus Heemstra, 1997 (Gulf smooth-hound)
 Mustelus stevensi W. T. White & Last, 2008 (western spotted gummy shark)
 Mustelus walkeri W. T. White & Last, 2008 (eastern spotted gummy shark) - now seen as a synonym of M. antarcticus
 Mustelus whitneyi Chirichigno F., 1973 (humpback smooth-hound)
 Mustelus widodoi W. T. White & Last, 2006 (white-fin smooth-hound)
 Mustelus sp. not yet described (Sarawak smooth-hound)
 Mustelus sp. not yet described (Kermadec smooth-hound)

See also

 List of prehistoric cartilaginous fish

References

 
Extant Ypresian first appearances